Hand Cut is the third studio album by the British pop group Bucks Fizz. It was released on 1 March 1983 and features the UK top 20 hits, "If You Can't Stand the Heat" and "Run for Your Life".

Overview 
Hand Cut continued the group's success, which had been building for two years since their Eurovision win.

The first single from the album was "If You Can't Stand the Heat" in November 1982, which became their fourth consecutive top ten hit in the UK charts. This was followed in March 1983 by "Run for Your Life", which reached UK#14. Along with this came the album's release, which received favourable reviews and became their third UK top 20 album. Remaining on the chart for three months, Hand Cut was certified silver by the BPI. The album also coincided with a successful 40 date UK tour.

Despite this, the group's management were concerned that the singles hadn't performed as well as the ones on their previous album and took the decision not to release any further singles from Hand Cut. Realising that their fans were now slightly older, they made a move for a more adult market - a factor which would remain for the rest of the group's recording career, but would ultimately provide their downfall. The following single became the hard edged "When We Were Young", which in the Summer of 1983 returned Bucks Fizz to the top ten, and a Greatest Hits compilation followed.

Some time after the group had fallen out of vogue, their record company, RCA made one last attempt to revive fortunes by releasing a single taken from this album six years after its release. The song was the ballad "You Love Love". It failed to chart and remains the group's last ever UK single release.

Other notable tracks from the album include "10,9,8,7,6,5,4" which was later covered by another Eurovision-winning group, Herreys. While today, fans of the group bemoan the lack of a third single from the album and cite "I'd Like to Say I Love You" as the perfect choice, which was voted in a poll as the group's all-time best song.

Hand Cut was released on compact disc for the first time in June 2004. In 2008, alternate versions of tracks "Run for Your Life", "If You Can't Stand the Heat", "I'd Like to Say I Love You" and "You Love Love" were featured on The Lost Masters 2 - The Final Cut compilation.

Reception and reviews 
As with the previous album, Hand Cut received many good reviews in the media. Smash Hits gave the album a 7 out of 10 rating, but thought that the over production was sometimes overpowering and preferred the quieter songs on the album (referencing "Where the Ending Starts"). The review stated that the album was well-produced however, saying it was "...another busy Andy Hill-directed epic. The trademarks are all here: ferocious production, terrific drum sound and booming choruses". Record Mirror claimed that "Run for Your Life" was too similar to a previous single "My Camera Never Lies", but did state that the group were now making "exceedingly good pop music". Writing for Irish magazine, RTÉ Guide, reviewer Brendan Martin gave the album a positive review, saying "Hand Cut follows the formula of their previous albums. There are two singles along with a selection of good pop songs". The New Straits Times gave the album a largely negative review saying that it was "overly clean, lacking a rough hewn edge". It did however single out two tracks which rose above "the mundane", namely "10,9,8,7,6,5,4" and "If You Can't Stand the Heat" calling them "catchy".

NME gave "Run for Your Life" a particularly good review, saying that the group were at their peak and singling out praise to producer, Andy Hill. Member Mike Nolan has listed track "You Love Love" as the best of their own songs.

In 2017, Classic Pop magazine reviewed the album positively, saying that it was "state-of-the-art pop", mentioning tracks "10,9,8,7,6,5,4" and "Running Out of Time".

Track listing

Personnel

Bucks Fizz 
Bobby G - Lead vocals on "I'd Like to Say I Love You", "Shot Me Through the Heart", "When the Love has Gone", "London Town" and "When We Were at War" 
Mike Nolan - Lead vocals on "Surrender Your Heart", "Stepping Out" and "Identity"
Jay Aston - Lead vocals on "Where the Ending Starts" and "Running out of Time"
Cheryl Baker - Lead vocals on "You Love Love"

Musicians 
Andy Hill - Keyboards, Guitars, Bass
 Nichola Martin - Keyboards, Backing vocals
 Richard Cottle - Keyboards
 Pete Wingfield - Keyboards
 John Reed - Bass
 Ian Bairnson - Guitars
 Graham Broad - Drums, Percussion
 Chris Hunter - Saxophone
 Spike - Trombones
 Guy Barker - Trumpets
 Anne Dudley - String arrangements

Production 
 Recorded at Mayfair Studios, Utopia Studios, Power Plant Studios, R.G. Jones Studios, Comforts Place Studios
Andy Hill - Producer
Brian Tench - Producer on "10,9,8,7,6,5,4" and "Surrender Your Heart"
Bobby G - Producer on "Identity" and "When We Were at War". Co-producer on "10,9,8,7,6,5,4" and "Surrender Your Heart"
 Bucks Fizz - Producer on "Stepping Out"
Brian Tench, Martin Webster, John Hudson - Engineers
Dean Murphy - Executive Producer of CD re-issue

Design 
John Thornton - Photography and Cover design concept
Andrew Christian - Design and art direction
Gered Mankowitz - Inner sleeve photography

Chart performance

References 

1983 albums
Bucks Fizz albums
RCA Records albums